Drama y Luz (English: "Drama and Light") is the eighth studio album released by the Mexican Latin pop/Rock en Español band Maná. This album was released in three formats CD, CD with DVD, and 12" LP vinyl record. The album was released on April 12, 2011, after a long wait of 5 years since their last studio album Amar es Combatir. 
The first single off the album is "Lluvia al Corazón", released on March 10, 2011. The song debuted at number-one on the U.S. Billboard Hot Latin Tracks. and the album made its debut at number 5 in the Billboard 200 selling 47,000 copies during its first week

Track listing

DVD
The CD/DVD edition is produced by Time Bender, produced by "Toiz" Rodriguez and directed by Iván López Barba and Rubén R. Bañuelos.

Personnel (band)
 Fher Olvera – main vocals, acoustic & electric guitars, coros, programming,
 Alex González – drums, vocals, coros, programming, keyboards
 Sergio Vallín – acoustic & electric guitars, coros, orchestral arrangements, string arrangements, keyboards, programming
 Juan Diego Calleros – bass

Additional personnel
 GusOrozco – guitar & bass arrangements, programming, keyboards
 Fernando "Psycho" Vallín – low arrangements, electric bass
 Fernando "El Bueno" Quintana – guitar & bass arrangements, string arrangements, coros, keyboards

 Héctor Quintana – coros
 Carlos Munguía – coros
 Luis Conte – percussions
 Jeff Babko – keyboards
 Benjamin "Jamie" Muhoberac – keyboards
 Tommy Morgan – harmonica
 Suzie Katayama – orchestra director
 Charlie Bisharat – master concert violinist
 Jackie Brand – violin
 Mario de León – violin
 Tammy Hatwan – violin
 Gerry Hilera – violin
 Tereza Stanislav – violin
 Josefina Vergara – violin

 Ken Yerke – violin
 Matt Funes – viola
 Jorge Moraga – viola
 Steve Richards – cello
 Rudy Stein – cello
 Nico Abondolo – contrabass
 David Parmeter – contrabass
 Chris Bleth – oboe
 Joe Meyer – French horn
 Steve Becknell – French horn
 Alan Kaplan – trombone
 Toño Márquez – lyrical advisor
 Augusto Chacón – copy editor
 José Quintana – vocal direction

Charts

Weekly charts

Year-end charts

Singles

Certifications

Awards 
Latin Grammy Award
2011: Best Rock Album
2011: Best Engineered Album

Grammy Awards
2012: Best Latin Pop, Rock or Urban Album

Los Premios Telehit
Los Premios Telehit 2011: Best Mexican Band International

See also
 Drama y Luz World Tour
 List of number-one Billboard Latin Albums from the 2010s
 List of number-one albums of 2011 (Spain)

References

External links
Official website of the band
Drama Y Luz on Amazon.com
[ Review and overview] at Allmusic

2011 albums
Maná albums
Warner Music Latina albums
Latin Grammy Award for Best Rock Album